AJN may refer to:

American Journal of Nursing
The Australian Jewish News
IATA airport code for Ouani Airport in Anjouan, Comoros